Zygaena nevadensis is a species of moth in the Zygaenidae family. It is found in France, Spain, Portugal, Romania, Bulgaria, the Republic of Macedonia, Greece, Russia and North Africa, including Morocco.

The larvae feed on Vicia species (including Vicia cracca and Vicia villosa) and Lathyrus pratensis. The larvae overwinters twice. Pupation takes place in April.

Subspecies
Zygaena nevadensis nevadensis
Zygaena nevadensis atlantica Le Charles, 1957 (Morocco)
Zygaena nevadensis gallica Oberthur, 1898
Zygaena nevadensis gheorghenica Reiss, 1976
Zygaena nevadensis interrupta Boursin, 1923
Zygaena nevadensis pelisterensis Reiss, 1976
Zygaena nevadensis schmidti Reiss, 1931
Zygaena nevadensis teberdica Reiss, 1939

References

Moths described in 1858
Zygaena
Moths of Europe
Moths of Africa